The surname Mikula, Micula or Mikuła may refer to:

Barbara Mikuła, founder of Polish independent music label Mystic Production
David Mikula,  Czech football player
Krzysztof Mikuła, Polish politician
Patrycja Mikula (born 1983), Polish model and Playboy Cybergirl
Piotr Mikuła, Polish Olympic field hockey player
Susan Mikula, American artist and photographer
Tom Mikula,  retired professional American football player